Bruce Harold Broughton (born March 8, 1945) is an American orchestral composer of television, film, and video game scores and concert works. He has composed several highly acclaimed soundtracks over his extensive career and has contributed many pieces to music archives, including the 1994 version of the 20th Century Fox fanfare, and conducting the Cinergi Pictures logo composed by Jerry Goldsmith. He has won ten Emmy Awards and has been nominated for the Academy Award for Best Original Score. Broughton is currently a lecturer in composition at UCLA.

Career
Broughton has composed the score for many notable films including Disney films such as The Rescuers Down Under (1990), Homeward Bound: The Incredible Journey (1993) and its sequel, Lost in San Francisco (1996), as well as popular westerns such as  Silverado (1985) and Tombstone (1993). Other films scored by Broughton include Young Sherlock Holmes (1985), Baby's Day Out (1994), Harry and the Hendersons (1987), Miracle on 34th Street (1994), and The Boy Who Could Fly (1986). with four songs arranged from The Loud House Movie. Additionally, he composed music for the video game Heart of Darkness and the animated TV series  Tiny Toon Adventures. In 1994, Broughton also conducted the fanfare for the 20th Century Studios logo that was composed by Alfred Newman. Furthermore, he also conducted the fanfare for Cinergi Pictures that was composed by Jerry Goldsmith.

Silverado earned him an Academy Award nomination, though he lost the Oscar to Out of Africa. He has won nearly a dozen Emmy awards.

Broughton is a member of the Board of Directors of ASCAP, a former Governor of both the Academy of Motion Picture Arts and Sciences (AMPAS) and the Academy of Television Arts & Sciences, a Past President of the Society of Composers & Lyricists, and a lecturer at UCLA and USC.

Academy Awards controversy

Broughton's song "Alone yet Not Alone", from the film with the same name, was originally nominated for an Oscar for Best Original Song at the 86th Academy Awards.  But on January 29, 2014, the nomination was revoked after the Academy discovered that Broughton, a former Academy governor who, at the time, was an executive committee member of the Academy's music branch, had improperly contacted other branch members.

"No matter how well-intentioned the communication, using one's position as a former governor and current executive committee member to personally promote one's own Oscar submission creates the appearance of an unfair advantage," Cheryl Boone Isaacs, the Academy's President, said in a statement.  Not everyone agreed with the Academy's actions.

Filmography

Television

Film

Concert work

Orchestral

Chamber music

Symphonic Band / Wind Ensemble

Awards
 Emmy Award wins:
 Warm Springs: Outstanding Music Composition for a Miniseries, Movie or a Special (Dramatic Underscore), 2005
 Eloise at Christmastime: Outstanding Music Composition for a Miniseries, Movie or a Special (Dramatic Underscore), 2004
 Eloise at the Plaza: Outstanding Music Composition for a Miniseries, Movie or a Special (Dramatic Underscore), 2003
 Glory & Honor: Outstanding Music Composition for a Miniseries, Movie or a Special (Dramatic Underscore), 1998
 O Pioneers!: Outstanding Music Composition for a Miniseries, Movie or a Special (Dramatic Underscore), 1992
 Tiny Toon Adventures: Outstanding Original Song for main title theme (shared with lyricists Wayne Kaatz and Tom Ruegger), 1991
 The First Olympics: Athens 1896: Part 1, Outstanding Music Composition for a Limited Series or a Special (Dramatic Underscore), 1984
 Dallas: Outstanding Music Composition for a Series (Dramatic Underscore) for episode "The Letter", 1984
 Dallas: Outstanding Music Composition for a Series (Dramatic Underscore) for episode "The Ewing Blues", 1983
 Buck Rogers in the 25th Century: Outstanding Music Composition for a Series (Dramatic Underscore) for episode "The Satyr", 1981
 Emmy Award nominations:
 The Dive from Clausen's Pier: Outstanding Music Composition for a Miniseries, Movie or a Special (Dramatic Underscore), 2006
 First Monday: Outstanding Main Title Theme Music, 2002
 True Women: Outstanding Music Composition for a Miniseries or a Special (Dramatic Underscore), 1997
 JAG: Outstanding Main Title Theme Music, 1995
 The Old Man and the Sea: Outstanding Music Composition for a Miniseries or a Special (Dramatic Underscore), 1990
 Two Marriages: Outstanding Music and Lyrics for the song "Home Here" (shared with lyricist Dory Previn), 1984 
 The Blue and the Gray: Part 2: Outstanding Music Composition for a Limited Series or a Special (Dramatic Underscore), 1983
 Quincy, M.E.: Outstanding Music and Lyrics for the song "Quincy's Wedding Song" from the episode "Quincy's Wedding", part 2 (shared with lyricist Mark Mueller), 1983
 Killjoy: Outstanding Music Composition for a Limited Series or a Special (Dramatic Underscore), 1982
 Dallas: Outstanding Music Composition for a Series (Dramatic Underscore) for the episode "The Search," 1982
 Dallas: Outstanding Music Composition for a Series (Dramatic Underscore) for the episode "The Lost Child," 1980
 Hawaii Five-O, Outstanding Music Composition for a Series (Dramatic Underscore) for the episode "The $100,000 Nickel," 1974
 Academy Award nominations
 Silverado, Best Original Score (1986)
 Grammy Award nomination
 Young Sherlock Holmes
 Saturn Award
 Young Sherlock Holmes: Best Music, 1985

References

External links

1945 births
American classical composers
American film score composers
American male classical composers
American male film score composers
American television composers
Animated film score composers
Concert band composers
Daytime Emmy Award winners
Living people
Male television composers
Primetime Emmy Award winners
Punahou School alumni
USC Thornton School of Music alumni
Tiny Toon Adventures
UCLA Herb Alpert School of Music faculty
Video game composers